World and I was a monthly magazine owned by News World Communications, an international news media corporation founded by Unification Church founder Sun Myung Moon. World and I started as a full-color glossy magazine in 1986 as a print magazine published by The Washington Times. It covered a broad range of articles by scholars and experts in the areas of politics, economics, global studies, liberal arts, fine arts, general science, and books. The magazine ceased publication in 2004.

The World and I Online
The print edition was later replaced by an online publication at the rate of one edition per month. The online publication now called The World and I Online is headquartered in New York City.

It previously contained Spanish language pages with articles from Tiempos del Mundo, a now defunct newsweekly published in the United States and in 15 countries of Latin America.

World and I has previously launched special features for K-12 schools, including subscription based core curriculum pages, weekly ESL and Spanish pages, teacher's guide lesson plans.

References

External links
World and I website
World And I - A Guide To Exploring & Protecting Our Planet

Monthly magazines published in the United States
Online magazines published in the United States
Defunct political magazines published in the United States
Education magazines
Magazines established in 1986
Magazines disestablished in 2004
Magazines published in New York City
Online magazines with defunct print editions